The 2016–17 Miami RedHawks men's basketball team represented Miami University during the 2016–17 NCAA Division I men's basketball season. The RedHawks, led by fifth-year head coach John Cooper, played their home games at Millett Hall, as members of the East Division of the Mid-American Conference. They finished the season 11–21, 4–14 in MAC play to finish in last place. As the No. 12 seed in the MAC tournament, they lost in the first round to Western Michigan.

Head coach John Cooper was fired on March 10, 2017 after five seasons at Miami. Purdue associate head coach Jack Owens was named the new head coach on March 29.

Previous season
The RedHawks finished the 2015–16 season 13–20, 6–12 in MAC play to finish in fifth place in the East Division. They defeated Ball State in the first round of the MAC tournament to advance to the quarterfinals where they lost to Buffalo.

Offseason

Departures

Recruiting class of 2016

Roster

Schedule and results

|-
!colspan=9 style=| Non-conference regular season

|-
!colspan=9 style=| MAC regular season

|-
!colspan=9 style=| MAC tournament

See also
 2016–17 Miami RedHawks women's basketball team

References

Miami
Miami RedHawks men's basketball seasons